SBS Viceland (stylised as SBS VICELAND) is an Australian free-to-air television channel owned by the Special Broadcasting Service (SBS). It began as SBS TWO on 1 June 2009, and was branded as SBS 2 between 2013 and 2016. On 8 April 2017, SBS Viceland began simulcasting in high definition. On 17 June 2019, the standard definition broadcast was closed and replaced by SBS World Movies, leaving SBS Viceland as a high definition-only channel.

Its flagship news and current affairs program The Feed airs Thursday nights at 8:30pm.

History
The establishment of SBS Viceland followed several alterations to SBS broadcasting and channels. The unconventional name 'Viceland' dates to a deal struck with a U.S.-Canadian media company in 2016, and does not reflect the channel's content.

From 2006 – 2009 SBS 2 was a Standard Definition channel on LCN31 which broadcast the same content as the SBS main channel. Extra information would be broadcast on this channel, for example sports highlights. The SBS 2 channel was available in all areas where SBS is currently broadcasting digital transmissions.

In a statement made by SBS in early 2009  plans for the channel SBS World were announced, to replace SBS World News Channel. On 26 April 2009, Freeview's website and advertisements showed that the channel would be called SBS TWO.

On 12 May 2009, SBS revealed programming details for the SBS TWO launch. This included a 5-minute feature at 6 pm called SBS TWO Launch: What is SBS TWO?, followed by the Academy Award winning short film Harvie Krumpet. On 1 June 2009, the SBS World News Channel stopped broadcasting and went into a loop of advertising for SBS TWO before the official launch later that day. SBS had originally planned for the channel to focus on Asia-Pacific speciality shows, international children's programming and English learning programmes.

On 20 February 2013, SBS announced major changes to the programming on SBS TWO, with a relaunch as a bold, provocative channel for younger audiences aged 16–39 from 1 April 2013, known as SBS 2.

In June 2016, Shane Smith, CEO of U.S.-Canadian media company Vice, announced at the Cannes Lions Festival that the company had reached deals with international broadcasters to launch localized versions of Viceland—a television brand featuring lifestyle-oriented reality and documentary-style programming aimed towards young adults. Among the partners announced was SBS.

On 4 October 2016, SBS and Vice officially announced that SBS 2 would be re-launched as SBS Viceland on 15 November 2016. Michael Slonim, marketing director of Vice Australia, stated that SBS shared Vice's "storytelling sensibilities and curiosity about the world", and felt that the launch would "help catapult Vice further into the consciousness of young Australians". Subsequently the channel has remained with SBS, but with some original programmes produced for the American Viceland channel. Despite using the Viceland brand name, it has no corporate association with the international affiliates.

SBS Viceland had a primetime share of 1% on its first night, up slightly from 0.7% for SBS2 the previous week, with the highest rated program Gaycation was viewed by 51,000 people.

On 17 June 2019, SBS Viceland became an HD only service on Channel 31. Channel 32 became SBS World Movies on 1 July 2019, also only in HD. An SD version of Viceland (alongside SBS and World Movies) continues to broadcast via Foxtel on the AEST schedule.

Programming

General
In addition to expanded international news programs during the day (including bulletins in Hindi, Korean, Greek, Macedonian, Polish and Portuguese languages), SBS Viceland screens documentary series, drama series and international films each night under themed programming blocks. An example is VICE Investigates, produced by VICE News. News-satire program The Feed moved from Viceland to the main SBS channel in 2020; awhile most of non-English news bulletins had relocated to SBS WorldWatch channel in 23 May 2022, leaving only the English news bulletins from international news channels aired on Viceland alongside the main SBS channel.

In April 2013, SBS 2's relaunch included various TV shows for a younger audience, including Bullet in the Face, Don't Tell My Mother, The Tales of Nights, Russell Howard's Good News, South Park, The Midnight Beast, Skins, Him & Her, Threesome, If You Are the One (A Chinese version of the Australian game show Taken Out), Housos, The Office, Parks and Recreation, Adam Ruins Everything and Community.

Sport

SBS Viceland broadcasts some sport. For example, an Illawarra Hawks v Perth Wildcats game in June 2021 received viewing figures of 40,000. SBS Viceland also broadcasts the NBA.

From its formation in 2009, Viceland's predecessor SBS 2 featured all stages of the Tour de France with full broadcasting rights in conjunction with SBS One, as well as exclusive UEFA Champions League matches as of the 2009–10 season. In 2010, SBS 2 aired repeat matches from the 2010 FIFA World Cup in South Africa with full broadcasting rights in conjunction with SBS One. In 2013, SBS 2 began broadcasting a weekly live A-League Friday-night match and A-League Finals matches. SBS 2 aired some matches from the 2014 FIFA World Cup, in conjunction with SBS.

Availability
SBS Viceland is available nationwide. SBS Viceland is an HD only channel on Channel 31. The service is broadcast in 1080i HD in an MPEG-4 format. SBS Viceland SD continues to broadcast via Foxtel.

In 22 July 2020, SBS Viceland has a viewer share of 1.8%.

Logo and identity history
The first logo for SBS 2 was inspired by the then-current logo for SBS with the "Mercator" symbol paired with the brand "SBS TWO". When SBS was renamed "SBS ONE" that same year, its new logo was based on the SBS 2 logo. After SBS 2 was rebranded on 1 April 2013, the channel received a new contemporary logo with "SBS" written next to an orange painted number 2. This logo was updated on 30 October 2015 with a bolder font for "SBS" and included the top half of the "Mercator" symbol attached to the top curve of the number 2. The logo once changed again after the launch of SBS Viceland on 15 November 2016. Although most international versions of Viceland have rebranded to Vice on TV, SBS Viceland retained its name due to it being fully controlled by SBS.

Identity history
1 June 2009 – 27 October 2011: "Six Billion Stories and Counting"
28 October 2011 – 1 April 2013: "Seven Billion Stories and Counting"
1 April 2013 – 15 November 2016: "BOLD. PROVOCATIVE."
15 November 2016 – present: "It's a TV Channel."

See also

List of digital television channels in Australia

References

External links

Special Broadcasting Service
English-language television stations in Australia
Television channels and stations established in 2009
Digital terrestrial television in Australia
Vice Media
2009 establishments in Australia